The 1940 Bulgarian Cup  (in this period the tournament was named Tsar's Cup) was the third cup competition, which took place in parallel to the national championship. The cup was won by FC 13 Sofia who beat Sportklub Plovdiv 2–1 in the final at the Levski Playground in Sofia. Initially the final was reached by Levski Ruse, but on 9 October 1940 the team declined to play due to financial disagreements with the football federation.

First round 

|}

Quarter-finals 

|}

Semi-finals 

|}

Final

Details

1940
Bulgarian Cup
Cup